Carlton Edward Battell (May 28, 1893 – January 31, 1988) was a Canadian professional ice hockey player. He played with the Regina Capitals of the Western Canada Hockey League. Previously, he played with in his hometown the Moose Jaw Moose and Moose Jaw Maple Leafs. He also tried out for the Vancouver Millionaires unsuccessfully in 1917. He was later a referee in the American Hockey Association.

Battell was also a prominent rugby player and curler. He represented Saskatchewan at the 1932 Macdonald Brier.

References

External links

1893 births
1988 deaths
Ice hockey people from Saskatchewan
Regina Capitals players
Sportspeople from Moose Jaw
Canadian ice hockey centres
Curlers from Saskatchewan
Canadian male curlers